OneSource may refer to:

Military OneSource, a U.S. Department of Defense program
Onesource State Apportionment, a tax product by Thomson Reuters
Vocabulary OneSource, a data analysis tool used internally by U.S. Air Combat Command